This is a list of bridges and other crossings of the Rivière des Prairies from the Saint Lawrence River upstream to the Ottawa River (Lac des Deux Montagnes).

See also
 List of bridges in Quebec
 List of bridges to the Island of Montreal
 List of bridges spanning the Rivière des Prairies
 List of crossings of the Saint Lawrence River
 List of crossings of the Rivière des Mille Îles
 List of hydroelectric stations
 List of crossings of the Ottawa River

Notes 
Construction of the Highway 25 Bridge started in early 2008 and was finished in May 2011. It is a toll bridge.

References

External links 
 Interactive map of Laval from the official website Shows both the borders and names of the 14 former municipalities (purple) and the borders only of the current 6 sectors (maroon), tick off both boxes beside "Limite administrative".

Crossings
 
Riviere des Prairies
Bridges in Laval, Quebec